Mong or Mung (مونگ ) is a village and Union Council of Mandi Bahauddin District in the Punjab province of Pakistan. It is a historic and densely populated village.

History
A local tradition says that Mong was built on the ancient city of Nicaea  which was founded by Alexander the Great in commemoration of his victory over Raja Porus in the Battle of the Hydaspes River. However, the ruins of the city of Nicea have not been found yet, and any attempt to find the ancient battle site is doomed, because the landscape has changed somewhat. The 1910 version of the Encyclopædia Britannica cited Mong as the location of "Nicaea", but the modern version no longer has this claim.

According to The Imperial Gazetteer of India:
" The overthrow of the Bactrians by the Parthians in the latter half of the second century brought another change of rulers, and the coins of the Indo-Parthian Maues (c. 120 BCE), who is known to local tradition as Raja Moga, have been found at Mong. At the end of the first century CE the whole of the Punjab was conquered by the Yueh-chi."

The Hungarian archaeologist and Silk Road expert Sir Marc Aurel Stein believed that instead of using the road from Taxila to Jhelum which dates from medieval times, Alexander's army would have gone south to cross the river near modern Bhera At this site the battle would have happened near the town of Mong. The topography, river orientation and natural features including salt cliffs in this vicinity match closely the description given in ancient sources. To further support this claim, the residents of Mong and nearby Phalia have a traditional claim that Mong is Hellenistic Nicaea.

Centuries later, at almost the same location, a few kilometers away from Mong, in the Second Anglo-Sikh War, the British forces under Lord Gough and the Khalsa Sikh Army fought the Battle of Chillianwala.

In the 2005 Mong shootings terrorist attack on October 7, 2005, 8 Ahmadi people were gunned down and 20 were injured while at morning worship.

Demography
The main ethnic groups are Arain, Ansari, Khokhar and Jat respectively. Most families work on their small native land farms although significant numbers of Mong residents have sought employment in Saudi Arabia, some other Gulf States and Europe.

The predominantly Muslim population supported Muslim League and Pakistan Movement. After the independence of Pakistan in 1947, the minority Hindus and Sikhs migrated to India while the Muslims refugees from India settled down in Mandi Bahauddin District.

Mong is also home to some famous players of Kabaddi district level team, and Volleyball and Cricket are favourite games of the village.

Alexander Cunningham on Nikaea or Mong 
Alexander Cunningham writes that "The position of Mong is 6 miles to the east of Jalalpur, and the same distance to the south of Dilawar. The name is usually pronounced Mong, or Mung [p. 178] but it is written without the nasal, and is said to have been founded by Raja Moga, or Muga. He is also called Raja Sankhar (Hindu lord Shiva's other name, Shankar), which I take to mean king of the Sakas, or Sakae. His brother Rama founded Rampur, or Ramnagar, the modern Rasul, which is 6 miles to the north-east of Mong, and exactly opposite Dilawar. His sister's son, named Kamkamarath, was Raja of Girjak or Jalalpur. The old ruined mound on which Mong is situated, is 600 feet long by 400 feet broad and 50 feet high, and is visible for many miles on all sides. It contains 975 houses built of large old bricks and 5000 inhabitants, who are chiefly Jats. The old wells are very numerous, their exact number, according to my informant, being 175."
"I have already stated that I take Mong to be the site of Nikaea, the city which Alexander built on the scene of his battle with Porus. The evidence on this point is, I think, as complete as could be wished; but I have still to explain how the name of Nikaea could have been changed to Mong. The tradition that the town was founded by Raja Moga is strongly corroborated by the fact that Maharaja Moga is mentioned in Mr. Roberts's Taxila inscription. Now, Moga is the same name as Moa, and the coins of Moa, or Mauas are still found in Mong. But the commonest Greek monogram on these coins forms the letters NIK, which I take to be the abbreviation of Nikaea, the place of mintage. If this inference be correct, as I believe it is, then Nikaea must have been the principal mint-city of the great king Moga, and therefore a place of considerable importance. As the town of Mong is traditionally attributed to Raja Moga as the founder, we may reasonably conclude that he must [p. 179] have rebuilt or increased the place under the new name of Moga-grama, which, in the spoken dialects, would be shortened to Mogaon and Mong. Coins of all the Indo-Scythian princes are found at Mong in considerable numbers, and I see no reason to doubt that the place is as old as the time of Alexander. The copper coins of the Nameless Indo-Scythian king especially are found in such numbers at Mong that they are now commonly known in the neighbourhood as Monga-sahis."

Maues (Moga) inscription of Takshasila 
One inscription is known which mentions Maues (usually called the "Moga inscription", and starts with:
 "In the seventy eighth, 78, year the Great King, the Great Moga, on the fifth, 5, day of the month Panemos, on this first, of the Kshaharata and Kshatrapa of Chukhsa - Liaka Kusuluka by name - his son Patika - in the town of Takshasila..."
Maues issued joint coins mentioned a queen Machene ("ΜΑΧΗΝΗ"). Machene may have been a daughter of one of the Indo-Greek houses.

An Indo-Greek king, Artemidoros also issued coins where he describes himself as "Son of Maues".

References

Union councils of Mandi Bahauddin District
Villages in Mandi Bahauddin District